Thomas Mühlbacher (born 11 May 1974) is an Austrian cyclist. He competed in the men's individual road race at the 2000 Summer Olympics.

References

External links
 

1974 births
Living people
Austrian male cyclists
Olympic cyclists of Austria
Cyclists at the 2000 Summer Olympics
People from Braunau am Inn District
Sportspeople from Upper Austria